Geoffrey Toone (15 November 1910 – 1 June 2005) was an English character actor and former matinee idol, born in Ireland. Most of his film roles after the 1930s were in supporting parts, usually as authority figures, though he did play the lead character in the Hammer Films production The Terror of the Tongs in 1961.

Life and career
Toone was born in Dublin, Ireland  to English parents and was educated at Charterhouse School and Christ's College, Cambridge. He served in the Royal Artillery during World War II, but was invalided out in 1942.                     
Toone's notable appearances include:
 As Sir Edward Ramsay in the musical film The King and I (he dances with Deborah Kerr in the banquet sequence, much to the annoyance of the King).
 As retired boxer and pimp Denny Lipp in "Jeff", a noteworthy 1960 episode of the TV series The Westerner, produced, directed and co-written by Sam Peckinpah. The episode also featured in a small role Warren Oates, who became a Peckinpah stalwart.
 The BBC science fiction television series Doctor Who:
 As Temmosus in the film of Dr. Who and the Daleks (1965)
 As Hepesh in the television story The Curse of Peladon in 1972.
 In Freewheelers as the Nazi officer Karl von Gelb who continually tries to avenge Germany's World War II defeat.
 As R. A. Crichton in "The Greasy Pole", a 1981 episode of Yes Minister.
 As Lord Ridgemere, owner of the stately home where Delboy and Rodney dropped a chandelier in the Only Fools and Horses episode, "A Touch of Glass".
 As Lord Bittlesham, a recurring character in the TV adaptation of P. G. Wodehouse's Jeeves and Wooster.

Death
He died from natural causes, aged 94, at Denville Hall in Northwood, London. At the time of his death, Toone was one of the last survivors of the Old Vic theatre company of the 1930s, having appeared alongside the likes of John Gielgud and Laurence Olivier in productions of Shakespeare. At the time, he was also the longest-lived actor to have appeared in Doctor Who. For many years he had shared a house with his close friend, the actor Frank Middlemass. "To their general amusement", they were often mistaken to be lovers, but in fact were not.

Selected filmography

 Queer Cargo (1938) .... Lieutenant Stocken
 Luck of the Navy (1938) .... Cmdr. Clive Stanton
 Night Journey (1938) .... Johnny Carson
 Sword of Honour (1939) .... Bill Brown
 Poison Pen (1940) .... David
 An Englishman's Home (A.K.A. 'Mad Men of Europe ') (1940) .... Peter Templeton
 Hell Is Sold Out (1951) .... Swedish Consulate Clerk
 The Woman's Angle (1952) .... Count Cambia
 The Great Game (1953) .... Jack Bannerman
 The Man Between (1953) .... Martin Mallison
 Captain Lightfoot (1955) .... Captain Hood
 Diane (1956) .... Duke of Savoy
 The King and I (1956) .... Sir Edward Ramsey
 Johnny Tremain (1957) .... Maj. Pitcairn
 Zero Hour! (1957) .... Dr. Baird
 Murder at Site 3 (1959) .... Sexton Blake
 Once More, with Feeling! (1960) .... Dr. Richard Hilliard
 The Entertainer (1960) .... Harold Hubbard
 The Terror of the Tongs (1961) .... Captain Jackson Sale
 Captain Sindbad (1963) .... Mohar
 Echo of Diana (1963) .... Col. Justin
 Dr. Crippen (1963) .... Mr. Tobin
 Blaze of Glory (1963) .... Roche
 The River Line (1964) .... Julian
 Dr. Who and the Daleks (1965) .... Temmosus
 The Scarlet Pimpernel (1982) .... Marquis de St. Cyr
 The Stone Carriers (1982) .... Narrator

References

External links
 
 

1910 births
2005 deaths
English male film actors
English male stage actors
English male television actors
People educated at Charterhouse School
Alumni of Christ's College, Cambridge
Royal Artillery personnel
British Army personnel of World War II
Male actors from Dublin (city)
20th-century English male actors
Military personnel from Dublin (city)